Amphipyra pyramidoides, the copper underwing, is a moth in the family Noctuidae. It is found in the US and southern Canada.

The wingspan is 38–52 mm. Adults are on wing from July through October depending on the location. There is one generation per year. They overwinter as eggs.

The larvae feed on the leaves of many broadleaf trees and shrubs, including apple, basswood, hawthorn, maple, oak, walnut, raspberry, grape, greenbrier (Smilax). The larvae are active in the spring; when ready to pupate they build a shelter by rolling a leaf. Aggregations of newly eclosed adults are found under bark, etc., in mid-summer.

References

Amphipyrinae
Moths of North America
Moths described in 1852